

Gmina Olsztynek is an urban-rural gmina (administrative district) in Olsztyn County, Warmian-Masurian Voivodeship, in northern Poland.

Villages
Apart from the town of Olsztynek, Gmina Olsztynek contains the villages and settlements of: 
 
 Ameryka
 Cichogrąd
 Czarci Jar
 Czerwona Woda
 Dąb
 Dębowa Góra
 Drwęck
 Elgnówko
 Gaj
 Gąsiorowo Olsztyneckie
 Gębiny
 Gibała
 Jadamowo
 Jagiełek
 Jemiołowo
 Juńcza
 Kąpity
 Kolatek
 Królikowo
 Kunki
 Kurki
 Łęciny
 Lichtajny
 Lipowo Kurkowskie
 Lutek
 Łutynówko
 Łutynowo
 Makruty
 Malinowo
 Mańki
 Marązy
 Maróz
 Marózek
 Mierki
 Mycyny
 Nadrowo
 Nowa Wieś Ostródzka
 Orzechowo
 Pawłowo
 Platyny
 Ruda Waplewska
 Rybaczówka
 Samagowo
 Selwa
 Sitno
 Smolanek
 Spogany
 Stare Gaje
 Sudwa
 Swaderki
 Świerkocin
 Świętajńska Karczma
 Świętajny
 Tolejny
 Tolkmity
 Tomaszyn
 Waplewo
 Warglewo
 Warlity Małe
 Waszeta
 Wigwałd
 Wilkowo
 Witramowo
 Witułty
 Ząbie
 Zawady
 Zezuty

Neighbouring gminas
Gmina Olsztynek is bordered by the gminas of Gietrzwałd, Grunwald, Jedwabno, Kozłowo, Nidzica, Ostróda, Purda and Stawiguda.

References
Polish official population figures 2006

Olsztynek
Olsztyn County

de:Olsztynek#Gemeinde